This is about the Swedish newspaper. For the American newspaper see Social-Demokraten (Chicago newspaper). For the Norwegian newspaper see Dagsavisen.
Social-Demokraten ("The Social Democrat") was a Swedish daily Social Democratic newspaper, belonging to the Swedish Social Democratic Party. The paper was founded in 1885 by Axel Danielsson and August Palm, and existed up to 1943 when it changed name to Morgon-Tidningen ("The Morning Paper"). The paper was based in Stockholm. Morgon-Tidningen existed up to 1958.

References

External links
"The Labor Issue" by August Palm and Axel Danielsson, in Social-Demokraten, 25 September 1885 (at Marxists.org)

1885 establishments in Sweden
1958 disestablishments in Sweden
Daily newspapers published in Sweden
Defunct newspapers published in Sweden
Newspapers published in Stockholm
Publications established in 1885
Publications disestablished in 1958
Socialist newspapers
Swedish Social Democratic Party
Swedish-language newspapers